The Pechet Foundation is an American private charitable foundation founded by Maurice Pechet. The organization is based in Dover, Massachusetts.

Background 

The foundation was established in 1960, and is predominantly a grant-making organization.

Geographic focus
The foundation has been active primarily in the United States and has been particularly active in the Massachusetts area.

Charitable giving 
The foundation has funded numerous scholarships and research grants.

In addition the foundation has made donations and provided grants to such organizations as the Golden Foundation for the Arts, the Earthwatch Institute, Coast Guard Foundation, The Surfrider Foundation, The Boston University School of Social Work, The Cambridge Family & Children's Service, The Young Audiences of Massachusetts, Free Press Action Fund, The New Sector Alliance, The Cambridge Center for Adult Education, The Marlboro Music Festival, The Center for Middle Eastern Studies at Harvard University, The Breast Cancer Research Foundation, The Perkins School for the Blind, The Center for Blood Research (CBR), and the New England Conservatory.

The foundation has also provided funding for the Pechet Family Conference Room at The Joseph B. Martin Conference Center at Harvard Medical School which can seat 70 to 120 people depending on its configuration.

References

External links 
 https://fdo.foundationcenter.org/

Non-profit organizations based in Massachusetts
Organizations established in 1960
Medical and health foundations in the United States
Educational foundations in the United States
Arts foundations based in the United States